Lake Burnside, also known as Oneahibunga, is a lake in the Gibson Desert, located in the Mid West region of Western Australia, northeast of Lake Carnegie. The smaller Lake Buchanan lies just to the south.

See also

 List of lakes of Western Australia

References

Burnside
Burnside, Lake